Users of Neo-Latin have taken the Latin language to places the Romans, and consequently, their language, never spread to, and consequently, have created a need to construct Latin city names in these places.

Strategies for constructing Latin names 
Little is known about how Romans adapted foreign place names to Latin form, but there is evidence of the practices of Bible translators.  They reworked some names into Latin or Greek shapes; in one version, Yerushalem (tentative reconstruction of a more ancient Hebrew version of the name) becomes Hierosolyma, doubtless influenced by Greek ἱερος (hieros), "holy".  Others were adopted directly, often treating the new place names as indeclinable nouns; here Yerushalem is brought over as Jerusalem, with the Latin J being pronounced as an English Y sound and the /sh/ being transliterated to the closest Latin sound, /s/.

Similar strategies are used for places beyond those known to the Roman Empire:
 A classical ending such as -um or -a is added or substituted on the end of the source word.  Hence Baltimorum for "Baltimore," Albania for "Albany."
 The word may already be in Latin or Greek form: Indianapolis, Cincinnati, Atlanta.
 Calques are resorted to if the New World name is based on an Old World name; the various Parises in the United States are likely to become Lutetia, and Novum Eboracum or Neo-Eboracum represents New York, because Eboracum is the city of York in England.
 The words are adjusted to fit Latin declensions: Kansas appears as either Cansas, Cansatis or Cansa, Cansae; Chicago, Ohio, and Idaho become consonant stems, with genitives Chicagonis, Ohionis, Idahonis, &c., by analogy with many Latin nouns whose nominative form ends in o.
 The words are re-interpreted to fit Latin declensions; Illinois is treated as a third-declension noun.  
 If the city is named for a specific thing, and especially if its name is a Romance language word or phrase, it may be directly translated into Latin.  For example, the Catholic Archdiocese of Los Angeles is called Diocesis Angelorum in Latin, "Diocese of (the) angels".
 On the other hand, in some dioceses the church chose to simply apply a Latin locational suffix to the existing name; the diocese of Des Moines, Iowa is simply Dioecesis Desmoinensis.
 The words are treated as indeclinable, like some Biblical names; Connecticut is sometimes treated this way.

In many cases, there is no consensus as to how to treat any given names, and variants exist.  A town which is the site of a university or an episcopal see is more likely to have a standard form hallowed by usage.  Note that names of cities are usually feminine in gender in Latin, even if they end in –us. This rule is not always strictly observed in the New World.

Note on word endings

Latin being an inflected language, names in a Latin context may have different word-endings to those shown here, which are given in the nominative case. For instance Roma (Rome) may appear as Romae meaning "at Rome" (locative), "of Rome" (genitive) or "to/for Rome" (dative), as Romam meaning "Rome" as a direct object (accusative), or indeed as Romā with a long a, probably not indicated in the orthography, meaning "by, with or from Rome" (ablative). Similarly names ending in -um or -us may occur with -i or -o, and names ending in -us may occur with -um. The words urbs and civitas  may occur as urbis, urbi, or urbe, and civitatis, civitati or civitate.

List of names

 Latinized form of a Greek name. Naples/Neapolis is a rare exception to the rule of Latinization of foreign city names owing to the fact that it was established by the Greeks and predates Rome by many centuries. There was no need to change it as the name was too deeply entrenched.
 Claudius Ptolemy mentions "Eblana" in his texts and scholars believe this is a name for Dublin. The Latinized name is more common in medieval texts.
 Latinized form of a Hebrew name.
 London was founded directly by the Romans as a fort, approximately where Westminster stands today. Classical texts written by Tacitus generally label this area of the frontier as "Britannia" with others later differentiating "Caledonia" or "Scotia" for Scotland. England didn't quite exist as a concept yet as the entire island was largely inhabited by Celts; the Angles were centuries away.
 Latinized form of a name derived from Amerindian languages.
 Cincinnatus was a real figure in Roman history who died in 430 BC. The city in Ohio is named for the Society of the Cincinnati, which in turned is named for him.
 -polis is a suffix from Greek; it belongs to the third declension.

See also
 Names of European cities in different languages
 List of city name changes

External links 
 Dr. J. G. Th. Grässe, Orbis Latinus: Lexikon lateinischer geographischer Namen des Mittelalters und der Neuzeit, online at the Bavarian State Library
 Grässe, Orbis Latinus, online at Columbia University
 Hofmann: Lexicon Universale
 GCatholic - Curiate Latin names of Catholic jurisdictions (usually the sees: cities)

Cities
Latin names